The Mixed Champions Invitational (mixed doubles) event at the 2007 US Open tennis tournament was won by Natasha Zvereva / Andrés Gómez and Anne Smith / Stan Smith.

Draw

Round robin

Mixed Champions Invitational